James Allen Whitmore III (born October 24, 1948), better known as James Whitmore Jr., is an American actor and director, best known for his roles as Captain Jim Gutterman on the television program Baa Baa Black Sheep, Freddie Beamer in The Rockford Files (1977–1979), and Sgt Bernie Terwilliger in Hunter (1984–1986), and since the 1980s as a prolific television director. He is the son of actor James Whitmore.

Life and career
Born in Manhattan, New York, Whitmore began his acting career relatively late. He has had recurring guest-starring roles on the TV series The Rockford Files and Hunter. He also appeared in two episodes of Magnum, P.I. and an episode of Battlestar Galactica before directing many episodes of series by Donald P. Bellisario, the creator of Magnum and a writer on Galactica.

Whitmore occasionally acts in the episodes he directs, such as two episodes of Quantum Leap ("8 1/2 Months" and "Trilogy, Pt. 1"). In that series, as well as several others, he played different characters in each appearance, rather than recurring roles.

In addition to directing episodes of shows for Bellisario (Quantum Leap, Tequila and Bonetti, JAG, NCIS, and NCIS: Los Angeles), Whitmore directed episodes of more than one series for Joss Whedon. Whitmore directed the final episodes of two different series (Dawson's Creek and the aforementioned Quantum Leap). After Leap, Whitmore again directed Scott Bakula in episodes of Star Trek: Enterprise, NCIS: New Orleans (including the Dean Stockwell reunion episode), and Mr. and Mrs. Smith. He  also directed David Boreanaz in both Angel and Bones. The Pretender reunited Whitmore with many of the same writing staff as Quantum Leap.

Filmography

Director 

 21 Jump Street (8 episodes)
 24 (6 episodes, all from Day 2)
 Angel (1 episode)
 Beverly Hills, 90210 (11 episodes)
 Bones (2 episodes)
 Brooklyn South (2 episodes)
 Buffy the Vampire Slayer (5 episodes)
 The Cleaner (2 episodes)
 Cold Case (6 episodes)
 The Commish (8 episodes)
 Crowfoot (television film)
 CSI: NY (1 episode)
 Dark Angel (2 episodes)
 Dawson's Creek (6 episodes)
 Dead Like Me (4 episodes)
 Evil (1 episode)
 Ferris Bueller (1 episode)
 Get Real (3 episodes)
 The Good Fight (3 episodes)
 The Good Wife (4 episodes)
 Hunter (23 episodes)
 JAG (2 episodes)
 Jericho (3 episodes)
 Las Vegas (2 episodes)
 Madam Secretary (4 episode)
 Mr. and Mrs. Smith (1 episode)
 NCIS (36 episodes)
 NCIS: Los Angeles (11 episodes)
 NCIS: New Orleans (first half of the NCIS backdoor pilot and 6 episodes)
 NCIS: Hawaii (2 episodes)
 Notorious (1 episode)
 Nowhere Man (3 episodes)
 Person of Interest (1 episode)
 The Pretender (7 episodes)
 Profiler (2 episodes)
 Providence (3 episodes)
 Quantico (1 episode)
 Quantum Leap (15 episodes)
 Ray Donovan (1 episode)
 The Resident (2 episodes)
 Roswell (2 episodes)
 Star Trek: Enterprise (2 episodes) 
 Tequila and Bonetti (4 episodes)
 The Resident (1 episode)
 The Unit (5 episodes)
 The X-Files (1 episode)
 Witchblade (4 episodes)
 Young Americans (5 episodes)
Evil (1 episode)

Actor 
 Baa Baa Black Sheep (1976–1977, TV Series) as Capt. James 'Jim' Gutterman
 The Rockford Files (1977–1979, TV Series) as Freddie Beamer
 Lou Grant (1977–1980, TV Series) as Nick Boyer / Officer Trask
 The Boys in Company C (1978) as Lt. Archer
 The Gypsy Warriors (1978) as Captain Sheldon Alhern
 Battlestar Galactica (1978, TV Series) as Robber
 The Eddie Capra Mysteries (1978, TV Series) as Dr. Faulkner
 A Force of One (1979) as Moskowitz
 The Long Riders (1980) as Mr. Rixley
 Magnum, P.I. (1981–1982, TV Series) as Sebastian Nuzo / Billy Joe Bob Little
 The Greatest American Hero (1981–1983, TV Series) as Norman Fackler / Byron Bigsby / Gordon McCready
 Simon & Simon (1981–1986, TV Series) as Campaign manager Al Goddard / Bill Freeman / Paul Scully
 Don't Cry, It's Only Thunder (1982) as Major Flaherty
 Purple Hearts (1984) as Bwana
 Airwolf (1984, TV Series) as Sam Houston / Maj. Sam Roper
 Highway to Heaven (1984, TV Series) as Richard Gaines
 Hardcastle and McCormick (1984–1985, TV Series) as Travis Baker / Kenneth Boyer
 Hunter (1984–1986, TV Series) as Sgt. Bernie Terwilliger
 The Twilight Zone (1985–1987, (TV Series) as Ira Richman (segment "The Girl I Married") / Sheriff Dennis Wells (segment "Nightcrawlers")
 Quantum Leap (1991–1993, TV Series) as Police Captain / Sheriff Clayton Fuller / Bob Crockett
 Stringer (1992) as Gunman

References

External links

1948 births
Living people
Male actors from New York City
American male film actors
American male television actors
American television directors
People from Manhattan